The Parbatya Chattagram Upajatiya Kalyan Samiti (United People's Welfare and Development Party of the Chittagong Hill Tracts) was a political organisation created in 1966 in Bangladesh (then East Pakistan) to represent  the 100,000 native peoples displaced by the construction of the Kaptai Dam and seeking rehabilitation and compensation. It was the precursor to the Parbatya Chattagram Jana Sanghati Samiti, which emerged as the main political party in the Chittagong Hill Tracts and founded the Shanti Bahini to carry out an insurgency against Bangladeshi state forces to gain autonomy and rights for the tribes and people of the Hill Tracts.

1966 establishments in East Pakistan
Organisations based in Chittagong
Chittagong Hill Tracts conflict
Defunct political parties in Bangladesh
Defunct political parties in Pakistan
Political parties established in 1966
Political parties with year of disestablishment missing